This is a list of the top-selling singles in New Zealand for 2012 from the Official New Zealand Music Chart's end-of-year chart, compiled by Recorded Music NZ.

Chart 
Key
 – Song of New Zealand origin

Top 20 singles of 2012 by New Zealand artists

Notes

References 

 Top Selling NZ Singles of 2012 - Recorded Music NZ

External links 
The Official NZ Music Chart - singles

2012 in New Zealand music
2012 record charts
Singles 2012